Pirate Hunters: Treasure, Obsession, and the Search for a Legendary Pirate Ship is a New York Times best-selling non-fiction book by Robert Kurson recounting the discovery of the pirate ship the Golden Fleece by two American divers, John Chatterton and John Mattera, in Samaná Bay off the north coast of the Dominican Republic in 2008. Until Chatterton and Mattera discovered the resting place of the Golden Fleece, Joseph Bannister's success as a pirate had little modern evidence.

Plot summary
Bannister had been a respected sea captain until he turned pirate.  The British government was unable to find Bannister for months until officials found him careening the Golden Fleece in Samaná Bay. Bannister faced two British frigates, the Falcon and the Drake, with a combined fifty-six cannons between them. Bannister placed two separate batteries of guns on island vantage points and battled the navy for two full days, until the warships ran out of ammunition and were forced to retreat. 

For over 350 years, the location of the wreck remained a mystery until after a multi-year search Chatterton and Mattera discovered the wreck long removed from where it was supposed to be.

References

 Shadow Divers Robert Kurson Random House | May 24, 2005 | 416 Pages | 5-3/16 x 8 | 
 "All Hands on Deck" New York Observer 06/16/2015 Matthew Kassel
 Boston Globe Doug Most 6/15/2015
 J. McCartney, Robert. "Into the Abyss". Washington Post.
 Jump up to: a b Grossman, Lev. "New Jersey's Lost U-Boat". Time
 M. Millard, Pauline. "A seaworthy U-boat saga". Los Angeles Times
 Singer, Michelle. "Divers Tell Tale Of Mystery Sub". CBS News
 "Best-Seller Lists: Hardcover Nonfiction". The New York Times
 New York Times Sunday magazine "A Shipwreck Hunter" John Mattera July 19, 2015

External links
C-SPAN Q&A interview with Kurson on Pirate Hunters, aired August 2, 2015

2015 non-fiction books
Books of maritime history
Piracy in the Caribbean
Works about ships
Shipwrecks in the Caribbean Sea
Random House books